The 1972 Meghalaya Legislative Assembly election was held on 9 March 1972. These were Meghalaya's first Legislative Assembly elections, following the creation of the state on 21 January 1972. 59 men and one woman, Percylina Marak, were elected.

Results 

The Hill State People's Democratic Party won 8 seats, but the party's representatives were recorded as independents in the official statistical report of the election.

Elected Members

Bypolls

References

Meghalaya
State Assembly elections in Meghalaya
1970s in Meghalaya